Yaginumena mutiliata is a species of comb-footed spider in the family Theridiidae. It is found in Japan and Korea.

References

Theridiidae
Spiders described in 1906
Arthropods of Japan
Arthropods of Korea